Dofteana is a commune in Bacău County, Western Moldavia, Romania. It is composed of seven villages: Bogata (Bogáta), Cucuieți (Kukujéc), Dofteana, Hăghiac, Larga (Lárga), Seaca and Ștefan Vodă.

At the 2011 census, of the inhabitants for whom data were available, 98.6% were Romanians and 1.3% Roma.

The commune is situated around confluence between the Trotuș and Dofteana rivers. It was first attested in a document of 1436, issued by the hospodar Ștefăniță, who donated to his adviser Babor Plopescu six villages on the Trotuș and Tazlău valleys, one of which was Dofteana, called Dohtana in that period.

References

External links
Dofteana Portal
Communes in Bacău County
Localities in Western Moldavia